Talavera is a genus of very small jumping spiders that was first described by George and Elizabeth Peckham in 1909. In particular, the Central European species are difficult to distinguish, even when their genital features are studied under a microscope. The name refers to Talavera, a region of Spain where many have been found.

Species
 it contains sixteen species and one subspecies, found in Europe, Asia, the United States, and Canada:
Talavera aequipes (O. Pickard-Cambridge, 1871) – Europe, Turkey, Israel, Caucasus, Iran, Russia (Europe) to Central Asia, China, Japan
Talavera a. ludio (Simon, 1871) – France (Corsica)
Talavera aperta (Miller, 1971) – Europe to Central Asia
Talavera esyunini Logunov, 1992 – Sweden, Finland, Russia (Europe to South Siberia)
Talavera ikedai Logunov & Kronestedt, 2003 – Korea, Japan
Talavera inopinata Wunderlich, 1993 – France, Luxembourg, Switzerland, Germany, Austria
Talavera krocha Logunov & Kronestedt, 2003 – France to Central Asia
Talavera logunovi Kovblyuk & Kastrygina, 2015 – Ukraine
Talavera milleri (Brignoli, 1983) – Portugal, Germany, Austria, Czech Rep., Slovakia
Talavera minuta (Banks, 1895) (type) – Canada, USA, Russia (East Siberia, Far East)
Talavera monticola (Kulczyński, 1884) – Central, Southern Europe
Talavera parvistyla Logunov & Kronestedt, 2003 – Northern, Central Europe
Talavera petrensis (C. L. Koch, 1837) – Europe to Central Asia
Talavera sharlaa Logunov & Kronestedt, 2003 – Russia (South Siberia)
Talavera thorelli (Kulczyński, 1891) – Europe to Central Asia, Mongolia
Talavera trivittata (Schenkel, 1963) – Russia (South Siberia), Mongolia, China
Talavera tuvensis Logunov & Kronestedt, 2003 – Russia (South Siberia)

References

Further reading

External links
 Photograph of T. petrensis

Salticidae genera
Salticidae